Friedrich Magnus VI, Count of Solms-Wildenfels (born 18 January 1927) is the head of the House of Solms-Wildenfels. Under Semi-Salic primogeniture, he could have a claim to the headship of the House of Schwarzburg through his mother, as heir to the principalities of Schwarzburg-Rudolstadt and Schwarzburg-Sondershausen, as well as a claim to the extinct House of Godwin, as he is a descendant of Harold Godwinson, the last Anglo-Saxon king of England, through his second daughter.

Early life
He was born in Wildenfels in Saxony, the son of Friedrich Magnus V, Count of Solms-Wildenfels (1886–1945) and his wife Princess Marie Antoinette of Schwarzburg (1898–1984).

Marriage
Count Friedrich Magnus married first on 7 February 1948 at Esslingen am Neckar in Baden-Württemberg, to Katharina Duerst (1923-1970), daughter of Harald Eduard Duerst and Käthe Saile. The couple were divorced in 1954 and remarried in 1966. Count Friedrich Magnus married for a third time on 30 September 1994 at Bonn Gisela Ursula Maria Paroll (1957).

Issue
Count Friedrich Magnus has had two sons, Count Michael, born at Esslingen am Neckar 10 January 1949 and died 2006, and Count Konstantin, Hereditary Count (Erbgraf) zu Solms-Wildenfels, born on 9 March 1950, who married 1st on 30 Mar 1973 (div.) Gabriele Schaessberg (b. 23 Jul 1951), and 2nd on 21 Mar 1994 Erica Krummacher (b. 6 Oct 1939), both marriages without issue.
His heir-presumptive as head of the House of Solms-Wildenfels is his kinsman, Count Bernhard zu Solms-Wildenfels (b.1941) who resides in Hamburg.

Ancestry

References

External links 

1927 births
German princes
Friedrich Magnus
People from the Kingdom of Saxony
Living people
German people of French descent